This was the first edition of the tournament.

Dennis Novikov won the title after defeating Ryan Harrison 6–3, 3–6, 6–3 in the final.

Seeds

Draw

Finals

Top half

Bottom half

References
Main Draw
Qualifying Draw

Columbus Challenger - Singles
Columbus Challenger